National Bulk Handling Corporation Pvt. Ltd. (NBHC) is an Indian commodity and collateral management company based in Mumbai.  NBHC is wholly owned by True North (erstwhile IVFA), a private equity major.

NBHC is managing assets worth Rs 1,85,000+ cr for 54 banks and has a pan-India warehousing presence with more than 3000+ warehouses across 23 states - adding up to total of 65 million metric tonnes agri commodities under management. It has 45+ functional QA labs and 200 + mobile labs for quality testing of around 170 agri-commodities, as well as pest management services across 16 states. NBHC also works closely with Government Organizations such as Food Corporation of India. It is accredited with ISO 9001 : 2015 / ISO 22000 : 2005. It is empanelled with ICCL (BSE) as Approved Warehouse Provider & Assayer for Agri, Non – Agri / Processed Commodities.

Awards
 SCM Pro Award for the Best Warehouse for Agri Commodity – 2015, 2016

References

External links
 
 
 

Companies based in Mumbai
Transport companies established in 2003
Logistics companies of India
2003 establishments in Maharashtra
Indian companies established in 2003